Kulm Municipal Airport  is a public use airport located one nautical mile (1.85 km) northeast of the central business district of Kulm, a city in LaMoure County, North Dakota, United States. It is owned by the Kulm Municipal Airport Authority.

Facilities and aircraft 
It has one runway designated 12/30 with a turf surface measuring 2,800 by 120 feet (853 x 37 m).

Pruetz Municipal Airport (5K9) 

References

External links 

 

Airports in North Dakota
Buildings and structures in LaMoure County, North Dakota